Clarence R. Martin (December 10, 1886 – May 2, 1972) was a justice of the Indiana Supreme Court from January 3, 1927, to January 3, 1933.

Martin began the practice of law in Indiana in 1907, and served in the United States Army during World War I, from 1917 to 1918, attaining the rank of major and commanding an infantry battalion at the front. In 1920, he "served as counsel for a U.S. Senate committee investigating radical activities". Despite his experience in practice, he did not obtain a law degree until 1922, when he graduated from the University of Michigan Law School. Following his law school graduation, he served as campaign manager for Senator Albert J. Beveridge. In 1926, Martin was elected as a Republican to the state supreme court, serving for a time as chief justice.

Martin died at his home in Indianapolis at the age of 85, survived by his wife Nellie, and a son and two daughters.

References

Justices of the Indiana Supreme Court
1886 births
1972 deaths
Place of birth missing
U.S. state supreme court judges admitted to the practice of law by reading law
United States Army officers
United States Army personnel of World War I
University of Michigan Law School alumni
Indiana Republicans